Bullett Raja is a 2013 Indian Hindi-language action film co-written and directed by Tigmanshu Dhulia and produced by Rahul Mittra, Nitin Tej Ahuja and Tigmanshu Dhulia, under the banner of BrandSmith Motion Pictures, Rahul Mittra Films and Moving Pictures. The film is presented by Fox Star Studios. The film features Saif Ali Khan, Sonakshi Sinha and Jimmy Sheirgill in leading roles, whilst Vidyut Jammwal, Chunky Pandey, Ravi Kishan, Vishwajeet Pradhan, Gulshan Grover and Raj Babbar feature in pivotal roles. The film is set against the backdrop of Uttar Pradesh-based mafia while dealing with the political and industrial powers of the State. It was the opening film at the 8th annual Mosaic International South Asian Film Festival (MISAFF) 2014 in Toronto. The film was released on 29 November 2013.

Plot
Raja Mishra (Saif Ali Khan) gatecrashes into a marriage while trying to escape from a brawl. The bride's cousin, Rudra Tripathi (Jimmy Sheirgill), and Raja form a friendship and Raja revealing that he is an uninvited guest. While in the process of seducing the mujra dancer, Raja overhears a plot by Lallan Tiwari (Chunky Pandey) to execute everyone in the wedding upon instructions from Akhand Vir (Vishwajeet Pradhan) wanting to use Rudra's uncle's land for poppy farming. Raja warns everyone about the impending attack, and Raja and Rudra to fight off the attacking Lallan Tiwari's gang. Rudra's uncle (Sharat Saxena) sees the potential in Raja and Rudra forming an alliance for offering protection to political personalities and offers them to join his gang. Not wanting to enter the world of politics, they refuse, and Rudra's uncle advises them to take refuge from Lallan's gang in jail. In a later incident, Rudra's uncle is killed by the Akhand Vir with the help of Lallan Singh.

In jail, Raja and Rudra meet Shirivastav Ji - a political advisor having knowledge of everything happening in Uttar Pradesh politics. He arranges for Raja and Rudra to leave jail and avenge the death of Rudra's uncle by killing Lallan. Their success creates news in political circles, and Shirivastav advises them to join hands with Ram Babu Shukla in order to take revenge against the Akhand Vir.

They start working for Ram Babu Shukla (Raj Babbar), a politician, and in the process kill the Akhand Vir, gain credibility and support in the political circles, which brings them fortune and fame amongst youth. Their friendship and partnership are the talks of the town, making the otherwise preferred hitman Sumer Yadav rendering useless.

While representing Ram Babu Shukla in an important meeting, Raja and Rudra are insulted by Bajaj (Gulshan Grover). In order to teach him a lesson, Raja and Rudra kidnap Bajaj while he is in the process of pretend interviewing a girl named Mitali (Sonakshi Sinha) for the role of an actress. They extort money from Bajaj, and in the process, Raja started to develop feelings for Mitali. On the advice of Shukla, Raja, Rudra, and Mitali, go to Mumbai until matters settle and avoid any attacked from Bajaj. Raja proposes to Mitali, and Rudra approves of their relationship. Later they return to UP, and while Raja is getting his sister's engagement done, Bajaj arrives at their house with a shooter Sumer Yadav (Ravi Kishan), and kills Rudra.

Raja takes his revenge by killing Bajaj, which turns all political and business fraternity against him. They all want him dead in order to gain Bajaj's money which is needed to fund their election campaigns but is being held by Shirivastav. They plot to kill him by appointing a police officer from Chambal, Arun Singh Munna (Vidyut Jammwal). Raja meanwhile moves to Kolkata with Mitali, where their romance furthers. Upon returning from Kolkata, Raja finds Sumer and kills him in front of Arun, and in the following fight, he spares Arun's life. A mole in Raja's gang (Gaurav Dixit), ordered by Shukla, plots to kill Raja. According to the plan, Arun will kill Raja, but then the mole will kill Arun to appease the youth that supports Raja. Raja finds out about the plan and reveals it to Arun. Together, they kill the mole and fake Raja's death. In the end, it shows Raja leaving with Mitali for a new life, and Arun is also shown to be leaving with them.

Cast
 Saif Ali Khan as Raja Mishra
 Sonakshi Sinha as Mitali
 Jimmy Sheirgill as Rudra Tripathi
 Vidyut Jammwal as SP Arun Singh Munna
 Chunky Pandey as Lallan Tiwari
 Ravi Kishan as Sumer Yadav
 Vishwajeet Pradhan as Akhand Vir
 Gulshan Grover as Jatin Bajaj (Marwadi)
 Raj Babbar as Minister Ram Babu Shukla
 Sharat Saxena as Rudra's uncle
 Vipin Sharma as Shirivastav ji - Political Advisor
 Deepraj Rana as Commissioner
  Gaurav Dixit as actor
  Gaurav K. Jha as Mithilesh Don
 Dulal Lahiri as Mithali's father
 Rita Dutta Chakraborty as Mitali's mother
 Sudip Mukherjee as Goon
 Mahi Gill in an item number Don't Touch My Body
 Sachin Thakre as Emraan Hashmi

Production

Development
The film's proposed name was Jai Ram Ji Ki but on the suggestion of Saif Ali Khan to producer Rahul Mittra it was named Bullett Raja to give it a more gangster feel. Sonakshi Sinha expressed excitement about working with Saif Ali Khan and called it a fresh pairing and joined the crew in February 2013. All male characters have grown a moustache to fit the role in the film. Earlier, actor Irrfan Khan was revealed to be a part of the film but he walked out because of hectic schedule and date clashes for his other projects. Later, producer Rahul Mittra replaced him with martial artist turned actor Vidyut Jamwal. Jamwal decided to design his stunts himself and without any body double. Later, Gulshan Grover was hired to play a negative role as a powerful industrialist in the film. The first teaser of Soha Ali Khan's starrer film Mr Joe B. Carvalho and trailer of Dedh Ishqiya were attached with Bullet Raja.

Filming
On 6 November 2012, the shooting of the film began in Lucknow, Raebareli, Kolkata and Mumbai were the other cities for filming later. The first leg of shooting came to an end in Lucknow on 10 December making it the first Bollywood film & producer Rahul Mittra the first film-maker to qualify for the film subsidy from Film Bandhu Uttar Pradesh while the second leg began at Kolkata at around last week of February 2013. Both real and fake guns are used during shooting while Saif used real guns for realistic look. The actors shot in the Dalhousie area of central Kolkata and other locations such as Princep Ghat, Kumartuli, flower market and the famous Laha Bari. After completion of schedule in Kolkata, the crew turned back to Lucknow to resume and then to Nashik for the final leg of the shooting.

Release
The film was released on 28 November 2013 in the USA and on 29 November in India.

Critical reception
On review aggregation website Rotten Tomatoes, 33% of 6 reported critics gave the film a positive review, with an average rating of 6/10.

Faheem Ruhani of India Today gave 3.5 out of 5 stars to the film and said, "Bullet Raja'''s slogan claims 'aayenge toh garmi badyaenge.' To the film's credit, it delivers what it promises." Sarita A Tanwar of Daily News and Analysis gave 3 of 5 stars to the film and said, "Watch it if you’re a fan of some edgy dialogues. As for the rest of it, you’ll want to rain bullets on this Raja".

Pre-release business

The film grossed  in its first week. In overseas markets, Bullett Raja'' grossed $1.25 million in ten days.

Soundtrack

The soundtrack album was released on 25 October 2013 on iTunes consisting of 7 tracks composed by RDB and Sajid–Wajid and lyrics written by Sandeep Nath, Kausar Munir, Shabbir Ahmed and Raftaar.

References

External links 
 
 

Indian crime action films
Films set in Uttar Pradesh
2013 films
2013 masala films
Films shot in Lucknow
Indian gangster films
Films scored by Sajid–Wajid
Films scored by Raftaar
Fox Star Studios films
2010s Hindi-language films
Films directed by Tigmanshu Dhulia
2013 crime action films